Hard launching is a launch system of a guided missile, where the missile's rocket engine is ignited while still inside the launch assembly or tube. 

This is technically simpler than soft launching but produces a large backblast area.

See also
Soft launch (missile)
Hot launch and cold launch

Missile launchers
Missile operation
Guided missiles